Nasir Uddin is a cultural anthropologist, post-colonial theorist and prolific writer on topics ranging from human rights, Adivasi (indigenous people) issues, rights of non-citizens, refugees, and stateless people, common forms of discrimination, government in everyday life, media, democracy, and the state-society relations in Bangladesh and South Asia. Currently, Uddin is a professor of anthropology at the University of Chittagong.

Education
Uddin graduated with a BSS with honors in anthropology in 1997 and a master's degree in anthropology in 1998 from the University of Dhaka. 

Later in his career, he studied at the Graduate School of Asian and African Area Studies as a Ph.D. in area studies with a major in cultural anthropology at Kyoto University in 2004. From November 2005 to April 2007, he carried out ethnographical fieldwork in the Chittagong Hill Tracts (CHT) toward writing his dissertation for his Ph.D. degree, which was eventually conferred in March 2008. The dissertation was about indigenous mobility, transitions in everyday life, politics of marginality, and engendering leadership among the marginalized Adivasis of the CHT. Apart from his intensive works on  general ethics, Uddin has been actively involved in doing ethnographic research on the Rohingya people living in the borderland of Bangladesh and Myanmar.

Career
In January 2001, Uddin joined the Department of Anthropology of the University of Chittagong as a lecturer and was promoted to assistant professor in 2003. In 2004, he was awarded a Monbukagakusho Scholarship. 

He was soon promoted to associate professor at Chittagong University in mid-year 2009. In the same year, Uddin was awarded a British Academy visiting fellowship for postdoctoral level research at the University of Hull in the UK. Soon after finishing his project in the country, Uddin conducted advanced research on "The State of Ethnic Minority in the State-formation in Post-colonial State: Experience from Bangladesh" as an affiliate of the Department of Sociology at Delhi School of Economics, the University of Delhi in the first half of 2011.

In 2012, Uddin was awarded an Alexander von Humboldt Foundation fellowship to do postdoctoral research at the Ruhr-Universität Bochum in Germany. During this time, Uddin taught courses in the Faculty of Social Sciences (2012-2013) while doing research on the anthropology of the state. He also did research at Heidelberg University, Germany, and Vrije Universiteit Amsterdam, the Netherlands as a visiting fellow in 2013. Later Uddin joined the Department of Anthropology at the London School of Economics and Political Sciences (LSE) as a visiting Scholar to continue his research on indigeneity, state-making, and marginality in the context of Bangladesh and South Asia in January 2014. Then, Uddin joined the Refugee Studies Centre (RSC) at the University of Oxford as a Visiting Research Fellow in 2018. At the same time, he worked as a Research Consultant at the School of Oriental and African Studies (SOAS), University of London. During his affiliation with Oxford University and SOAS, he worked on the ethnicity, identity, and representation of the Rohingya people. In addition, Uddin had been traveling across the world and giving lectures and presentations on his research on indigeneity, the state in everyday life, and refugee studies (particularly on the Rohingya people) regularly in many renowned universities of many countries, including the US, UK, Canada, Germany, France, the Netherlands, Japan, Australia, Indonesia, Malaysia, India, and China.

Fields of research
His current fields of research include:
 Statelessness, (Non)Citizenship and Refugeehood;
 Ethnicity and the Formation of Ethnic Category in De-territorialised world;
 Mobility and Transition in Identity and Cultural Entity;
 Indigeneity, Identity-politics and Belongingness;
 Subaltern Studies and the Politics of Marginality;
 Dialectics between Colonialism and Post-colonialism;
 Peace and Conflict Studies;
 Notions of Power and State in Everyday Life;
 Migration and Refugee Studies;
 Islam and Secularism,
 Dynamics of Regionalism and Area Studies;
 Paradox of Modernity and Globalization;
 Interface of Local Wisdom and Global Doctrine.

Journal articles and edited books
Uddin has published numerous journal articles, edited volumes and written books  on the Chittagong Hill Tracts, colonialism and post-colonialism, anthropology of the state, adivasi Issues, and Rohingya refugees issues among others. His recent edited books, Life in Peace and Conflict: Indigeneity and State in the Chittagong Hill Tracts (Delhi: Orient BlackSwan, 2017) and Indigeneity on the Move: Varying Manifestation of a Contested Concept (Oxford & New York: Berghahn, 2017) have earned tremendous international attentions and recognition. Uddin along with Dr. Nasreen Chowdhury of Delhi University is editing another book titled Deterritorialised Identity and Transborder Movements in South Asia (Singapore: Springer, 2018). His forthcoming monograph title The Rohingya: A Case of "Subhuman" from the Oxford University Press has meanwhile become the centre of attention of scholars working on refugees, stateless people, migration, transborder mobility, asylum seekers, camp people, and forcibly displaced people across the globe.

Theory of "Subhuman" 
Uddin has been working for years to build a new theory of what is called "Subhuman" theory to understand the people living in an acute marginalized and atrocious conditions. 'Subhuman' is a theory to understand an acute vulnerable condition of the people and the nature of the state. It could also provide a new framework of understanding genocide, ethnocide, ethnic cleansing and domicide. Uddin argues that 'subhuman' is a category of people who are born in human society, but have no space in the human community. 'Subhuman' does not receive treatments what a human deserves, and does not lead a life like a human being. 'Subhumans' are born in the world, but the world does not own them in any state-structure. 'Subhuman' are treated as like o-manush (non-human) since they do not exist in the legal framework of any state. 'Subhuman' is a particular category of people who live in the borderland of 'life' and 'death'. 'Subhumans' are not human in their due dignity, rights and voice as are dealt with as if less than human beings. Towards establishing his theory of "Subhuman", Uddin's monograph title The Rohingyas: A Case of "Subhuman" Life has been published by the Oxford University Press (2020) which contains the theory of 'subhuman' life with the reference of the Rohingya people living in the borderland of Bangladesh and Myanmar. His theory of "subhuman" is being widely spreading up across the world with huge appreciations. Recently, Uddin gave three consecutive talks on his theory of "Subhuman" at Asia Institute in the University of Toronto, International Migration Research Centre (IMRC) at Wilfrid Laurier University, Waterloo and Centre for Refugee Studies at York University. He also gave lecture on his "subhuman theory" in the 8th Humboldt Foundation Winners Forum Meeting in Bonn, Germany on October 18, 2018. Uddin gave lectures on his "subhuman" theory at the Refugee Studies Centre (RSC) of Oxford University, Department of Anthropology and Sociology at SOAS and the Centre for Migration, Refugees, and Belonging at the University of East London (UEL) in November 2018. He recently was on a tour of series lectures at a number of universities in the USA where he gave lectures on his subhuman theory. The universities include Columbia University (on October 10, 2019), New York University(NYU) (on October 11, 2019), The New School for Social Research (on October 16, 2019), University of Delaware (October 17 & 18, 2019) and Cornell University (on October 21, 2019). Uddin also gave a series of lectures in Australia including universities in Sydney, Melbourne and Adelaide in December 2019.

Ethnography is a "joint product" 
Uddin published an article titled "Decolonising ethnography in the field: an anthropological account]" in the International Journal of Social Research Methodology where he articulated a theoretical proposition as ethnography is a "joint product". Uddin wrote, 'Colonialism does not end with the withdrawal of colony from occupied territories but it exists across time. There is a constant dialogue between colonial domination and post-colonial transformation both in principle and practice. Doing ethnographic fieldwork therefore involves justifiable positioning of researcher in the interface between subjectivity and objectivity whilst ethnography itself is struggling with the question of representation in connection with the colonial tradition of imaging anthropological object as 'uncivilised others'. There is an overdue need of decolonising ethnography since Malinowski's field dairy was published. However, an ethnographer still encounters colonial ideology in the field in making meaning of ethnographic data. How does an ethnographer encounter colonial inheritance in the field? How does s/he position herself/himself in the context of ethnographer's supremacy in object's world?'. All these questions could be answered if ethnography could become a "joint product" where the researcher and the people studied are equally reflected, represented with sensible position, and voiced reciprocally. Soon after the article was published, Uddin's theoretical proposition 'ethnography is a joint product' received wider academic attention in social sciences particularly in Anthropology across the world.

Many faces of the state
Anthropology of the state has grown up as an emerging field of research in Anthropology during the last three decades. In classical anthropology, political organisations and political systems in stateless societies constituted the major field of investigation, rather than the idea of the state. British social anthropology in particular paid attention to how political organizations and political systems used to function in African society without even the concept of what we now call the state. Since the late 1990s, anthropological understanding of the state has increasingly grown up under a specialized field of study providing perspectives from the margins of society. During the last three decades, anthropology of the state has come up with a very strong field of study where many scholars have contributed to building theories with their own ethnographic works from across the world. Uddin with his colleague Eva Gergarz has published an article titled "The Many Faces of the State: Living in Peace and Conflict in the Chittagong Hill Tracts, Bangladesh" in Conflict and Society: Advances in Research which has contributed a new theoretical framework to understand state from the margin phrasing "The Many Faces of the State". Uddin and Gerharz have argued that the state has many faces which become functional in dealing with the people who (re)define the many faces of the state amidst their everyday lived experience. Uddin and Gerhaz's theory is widely known as "state has many faces" in the anthropology of the state and the margins.

References

Bangladeshi anthropologists
Living people
Bangladeshi human rights activists
Year of birth missing (living people)